Paulo Carvalho may refer to:
 Paulo Carvalho (boxer)
 Paulo Carvalho (rower)

See also
 Paulo de Carvalho, Portuguese singer